Shakeshaft is a surname. Notable people with the surname include:

 Charol Shakeshaft, American education scholar
 Jenny Shakeshaft (born 1984), American actress and model